Philip David Zelazo (born 1966) is a developmental psychologist and neuroscientist. His research has helped shape the field of developmental cognitive neuroscience regarding the development of executive function (i.e., conscious self-control of thought, action, and emotion).

Background

Zelazo earned an Honours B.A. from McGill University (1988) and a Ph.D. with Distinction from Yale University (1993). From 1992 to 2007, he was on the faculty at the University of Toronto, where he held the Canada Research Chair in Developmental Neuroscience. In 2007, Zelazo moved to the University of Minnesota, where he holds the Nancy M. and John E. Lindahl Professorship in the Institute of Child Development, and is co-director (with Stephanie M. Carlson) of the Developmental Social Cognitive Neuroscience Lab. He also co-founded (2004) and served as co-director of a child development research center at Southwest University in Chongqing, China, until 2012. His father, Philip Roman Zelazo, is a psychologist and Director of the Montreal Autism Centre.

Zelazo has authored over 130 scientific papers. Among numerous other volumes, Zelazo co-edited the Cambridge Handbook of Consciousness, and Developmental Social Cognitive Neuroscience, and he edited The Oxford Handbook of Developmental Psychology (2013, 2 volumes).

Research

Professor Zelazo studies the development and neural bases of executive function. His work has generated a number of influential ideas, including the "Cognitive Complexity & Control Theory", the notion that executive function depends, in part, on the ability to use complex, higher-order rules (formulated in self-directed speech); "Levels of Consciousness", the notion that conscious control develops through a series of levels characterized by greater degrees of reflection; the "Iterative Reprocessing Model", which posits that reflection occurs when information is reprocessed via neural circuits involving the prefrontal cortex; the "Hierarchical Competing Systems Model" of the early emergence of executive function; and the importance of the distinction between more “cool,” cognitive aspects of executive function vs. more “hot,” emotional aspects.

Other research interests include: Affective decision-making; prefrontal and orbitofrontal contributions to executive function (using EEG/ERP and fMRI); Executive function in special populations (externalizing disorders, autism); Computational models of cognitive processes; Mindfulness meditation; Consciousness; Developmental chronopsychology (circadian rhythms, sleep, and psychological function); Language and other cultural influences on cognitive development.

Zelazo also has made major methodological contributions to the study of executive function, including the "Dimensional Change Card Sorting Task", which demonstrated a striking developmental shift from age 3 to 5 years in rule-based reasoning and self-control, and has become a leading behavioral assessment of executive function for preschool children.  He was lead developer of the executive function measures for the NIH Toolbox for the Assessment of Neurological and Behavioral Function. He served on the Scientific and Coordinating Committee for Health Measurement (SCCHM), National Children's Study, where he was the lead scientist for the Cognitive Health Domain.

In 2014, Zelazo and Stephanie M. Carlson co-founded a university-based start-up company, Reflection Sciences, Inc., to disseminate information about executive function skills and provide tools for assessing those skills and promoting their healthy development.

Current investigations in Zelazo's lab include behavioral and brain developmental research in executive function, mindfulness meditation, and reflection training to improve executive function as well as academic and social adjustment in childhood.

Selected Honors

 President, Jean Piaget Society, 2011-2014
 Senior Fellow, Mind and Life Institute, 2010
 Advisory Board, Baumann Institute, 2009-2011
 Fellow, American Psychological Society, 2008
 Canada's Top 40 Under 40 Award, 2006
 Fellow, American Psychological Association, Division 7, 2002
 Canada Research Chair in Developmental Neuroscience, 2001–2006, 2006-2007 (resigned)
 Premier's Research Excellence Award (Government of Ontario, Canada), 1999
 Boyd McCandless Young Scientist Award, American Psychological Association (Div. 7), 1997

Selected works

 Zelazo, P. D., Astington, J. W., & Olson, D. R. (Eds.) (1999). Developing theories of intention: Social understanding and self-control. Mahwah, NJ: Erlbaum.
 Zelazo, P. D., Muller, U., Frye, D., & Marcovitch, S. (2003). The development of executive function in early childhood. Monographs of the Society for Research in Child Development, 68(3), Serial No. 27.
 Zelazo, P. D. (2004). The development of conscious control in childhood. Trends in Cognitive Sciences, 8, 12–17.
 Kerr, A., & Zelazo, P. D. (2004). Development of "hot" executive function: The Children's Gambling Task. Brain and Cognition, 55, 148–157.
 Bunge, S., & Zelazo, P. D. (2006). A brain-based account of the development of rule use in childhood. Current Directions in Psychological Science, 15, 118–121.
 Zelazo, P. D. (2006). The dimensional change card sort (DCCS): A method of assessing executive function in children. Nature Protocols, 1, 297–301.
 Zelazo, P. D., Moscovitch, M., & Thompson, E. (Eds.) (2007). Cambridge handbook of consciousness. New York: Cambridge University Press.
 Cunningham, W., & Zelazo, P. D. (2007). Attitudes and evaluation: A social cognitive neuroscience perspective. Trends in Cognitive Sciences, 11, 97–104.
 Zelazo, P. D., Carlson, S. M., & Kesek, A. (2008). The development of executive function in childhood. In C. Nelson & M. Luciana (Eds), Handbook of Developmental Cognitive Neuroscience (2nd Ed.) (pp. 553–574). Cambridge, MA: MIT Press.
 Marcovitch, S., & Zelazo, P. D. (2009). A hierarchical competing systems model of the emergence and early development of executive function (Target article with commentaries). Developmental Science. 12, 1–18.
 Zelazo, P. D. Chandler, M., & Crone, E. A. (Eds.) (2009). Developmental social cognitive neuroscience. New York: Psychology Press.
 Lewis, M., Lamm, C., Segalowitz, S., Stieben, J., & Zelazo, P. D. (2006). Neurophysiological correlates of emotion regulation in children and adolescents. Journal of Cognitive Neuroscience, 18, 430–443.
Espinet, S. D., Anderson, J. E., & Zelazo, P. D. (2013). Reflection training improves executive function in preschool-age children: Behavioral and neural effects. Developmental Cognitive Neuroscience, 4, 3–15. 
 Zelazo, P. D., & Carlson, S. M. (2012). Hot and cool executive function in childhood and adolescence: Development and plasticity. Child Development Perspectives, 6, 354–360.
 Zelazo, P. D., & Lyons, K. E. (2012). The potential benefits of mindfulness training in early childhood: A developmental social cognitive neuroscience perspective. Child Development Perspectives, 6, 154–160.

References

Living people
21st-century American psychologists
McGill University alumni
Yale Graduate School of Arts and Sciences alumni
University of Minnesota faculty
1966 births
Canada Research Chairs
Milton Academy alumni
20th-century American psychologists